Kick Me is a 1975 animated short film
made by Robert Swarthe.

Summary
The film is about a pair of red legs and its misadventures on celluloid film involving a giant baseball and spiders.

Production
The animation was produced by drawing pictures directly onto frames of film stock, instead of by inking/painting and photographing cels as in traditional animation techniques of the era.

Reception and legacy
It was nominated for Academy Award for Best Animated Short Film and was featured on Fantastic Animation Festival.

It was preserved by the Academy Film Archive in 2010.

References

External links
 
  on Cartoon Brew

1975 films
1975 animated films
American avant-garde and experimental films
Self-reflexive films
Drawn-on-film animated films
American animated short films
1970s rediscovered films
Rediscovered American films
1970s American films